Rainer Ganahl (born 18 October 1961 in Bludenz) is an Austrian-American conceptual artist who lives and works in New York. His work has been widely exhibited, including the Kunsthaus Bregenz, Austria; The Wallach Art Gallery, Columbia University, New York; the Gesellschaft für Aktuelle Kunst, Bremen, Germany; and the 48th Venice Biennale. He is the subject and author of several published catalogues, among them, Reading Karl Marx (London: Book Works, 2001); Ortsprache—Local Language (Kunsthaus Bregenz, 1998), and Rainer Ganahl: Educational Complex (Vienna: Generali Foundation, 1997).

Life
From 1986 until 1991, he studied at the University of Applied Arts Vienna (Peter Weibel) and the Kunstakademie Düsseldorf (Nam June Paik). He was a member of the 1990/91 Whitney Museum Independent Study Program in New York City. He was a professor of visual arts at the State Academy of Fine Arts Stuttgart.

Work

Rainer Ganahl started his career exploring computer based art, a pioneering field for its time. His first exhibition in this area was demonstrated at Philomene Magers in 1990.

His best known work, S/L (Seminars/Lectures), is an ongoing series of photographs, begun in 1995, of well-known cultural critics addressing audiences. The photographs, taken in university class rooms and lecture halls, not only show the lecturer but also the listeners and students in the audience. In a similar way, he documented his own process of learning an "exotic" language (e. g., Basic Japanese) into an art project.

In his Imported-Reading Seminars held from 1995 onward, the group study of theoretical works from specific countries were documented on video. His exhibition "El Mundo" at Kai Matsumiya was recently listed as one of the top exhibitions of 2014 by the New York Times, and the film was subsequently acquired in the permanent collections at the Whitney Museum of American Art and the Hirschorn Collection at the Smithsonian.

Besides his photographic work and media art, Ganahl has been painting throughout his career, often integrating current news coverage into his pictures.

Rainer Ganahl represented Austria at the 1999 Venice Biennale.

Bibliography
Rainer Ganahl, Manhattan Marxism, Published by Sternberg Press, Berlin, 2018. 
Rainer Ganahl, Ubu Trump: A tragi-comic play, 2018. 
 Hartle, Johan F., and Rainer Ganahl. DadaLenin. Stuttgart: Edition Taube, 2013. 
Rainer Ganahl: Use a bicycle, Rainer Ganahl, Der Lehrling in der Sonne. The Apprentice in the Sun, L'apprenti dans le soleil, 2007. Revolver Verlag, Frankfurt, Kunstmuseum Stuttgart. 
 Rainer Ganahl: MONEY AND DREAMS: COUNTING THE LAST DAYS OF THE SIGMUND FREUD BANKNOTE. Putnam, CT: Spring Publications, 2005. 
 Rainer Ganahl, Road to War, Published by MUMOK (Museum of Modern Art Vienna), and Verlag der Buchhandlung Walther König, Cologne. 240 pages, 2005. 
 William Kaizen, "Please, teach me" - Rainer Ganahl and the Politics of Learning, 2005
 Rainer Ganahl, NEXT TARGET - Versteinerte Politik / Petrified Politics, 2004. Published by GAK (Gesellschaft für Aktuelle Kunst, Bremen), and Revolver, Frankfurt. 
 Rainer Ganahl, lueneburger-heide-sprechen, revolver, Frankfurt 2003. 
 Rainer Ganahl, Reading Karl Marx, Book Works, London, 2001. 
 Rainer Ganahl (ed), IMPORTED - A Reading Seminar, Semiotext(e), New York 1998.

References

External links 

Art in America review
zingmagazine interview
Rainer Ganahl's Works in the Dikeou Collection

Living people
Austrian emigrants to the United States
1961 births
Kunstakademie Düsseldorf alumni
Austrian contemporary artists